Sahitya Akademi Award is given each year, since 1955, by Sahitya Akademi (India's National Academy of Letters), to writers and their works, for their outstanding contribution to the upliftment of Indian literature and Assamese literature in particular. No awards were conferred in 1956, 1957, 1958, 1959, 1962, 1963, 1965, 1971, 1973 and 2013.

Recipients

References

 
Sahitya Akademi Award
Sahitya Akademi Award
Assamese
Literary awards by language